The Order of Francisco de Miranda (Orden Francisco de Miranda) is conferred by the Republic of Venezuela in memory of Francisco de Miranda (1754–1816). This national honor and decoration was created to recognize Venezuelan citizens and foreigners who have contributed to the sciences, to the progress of the country, to the humanities or who have exemplified outstanding merits.  There are several variations in this Order.  This Order was originally a medal, established in 1934; however, it was established as an Order on July 28, 1939.

History
This honor, conferred by the President of Venezuela, was established in the 1930s.  Subsequent legislation modifying the Order, the former Law on the Condecoration of the Francisco de Miranda Order was enacted in July 1943.  More recently, the law was revised further in 2006, establishing the different levels or rankings within the Order and also identifying potential categories of recipients.

Description

The gold-colored neck order badge features an oblong maroon enamel center showing the left-facing profile of Francisco de Miranda. The Venezuelan patriot's name is emblazoned across the upper quadrants of a band which encompasses this central image. Eight sunburst rays extend from this enameled focal point; and these rays are supported by a single encircling nimbus band of gold. The obverse features an embossed image of the coat of arms of the República Bolivariana de Venezuela. The device measures approximately 3-1/4 inches in diameter; and it is designed to hang from a bright yellow ribbon which is 1-3/8 inches wide, 18 inches in length.

The official medal contractor for the Venezuelan government was N. S. Meyer of New York City.

Recipients

Notes

References
  Ley sobre la Condecoración Orden Francisco de Miranda / Law on the Condecoration of the Francisco de Miranda Order. World Legal Information Institute,  Global Legal Information Network. GLIN 195572, 2006.
 Wasserman, Paul and Jancie W. McLean. (1994).  Awards, Honors & Prizes. Detroit: Gale Research Company. ;  OCLC 1326263
 Werlich, Robert. (1965).  Orders and Decorations of All Nations: Ancient and Modern, Civil and Military. Washington, D.C.: Quaker Press.   OCLC 390804

External links

   Condecoraciones de Venezuela (in Spanish)

Francisco de Miranda
Orders, decorations, and medals of Venezuela
Awards established in 1939
1939 establishments in Venezuela